A proper reference frame in the theory of relativity is a particular form of accelerated reference frame, that is, a reference frame in which an accelerated observer can be considered as being at rest. It can describe phenomena in curved spacetime, as well as in "flat" Minkowski spacetime in which the spacetime curvature caused by the energy–momentum tensor can be disregarded. Since this article considers only flat spacetime—and uses the definition that special relativity is the theory of flat spacetime while general relativity is a theory of gravitation in terms of curved spacetime—it is consequently concerned with accelerated frames in special relativity. (For the representation of accelerations in inertial frames, see the article Acceleration (special relativity), where concepts such as three-acceleration, four-acceleration, proper acceleration, hyperbolic motion etc. are defined and related to each other.)

A fundamental property of such a frame is the employment of the proper time of the accelerated observer as the time of the frame itself. This is connected with the clock hypothesis (which is experimentally confirmed), according to which the proper time of an accelerated clock is unaffected by acceleration, thus the measured time dilation of the clock only depends on its momentary relative velocity. The related proper reference frames are constructed using concepts like comoving orthonormal tetrads, which can be formulated in terms of spacetime Frenet–Serret formulas, or alternatively using Fermi–Walker transport as a standard of non-rotation. If the coordinates are related to Fermi–Walker transport, the term Fermi coordinates is sometimes used, or proper coordinates in the general case when rotations are also involved. A special class of accelerated observers follow worldlines whose three curvatures are constant. These motions belong to the class of Born rigid motions, i.e., the motions at which the mutual distance of constituents of an accelerated body or congruence remains unchanged in its proper frame. Two examples are Rindler coordinates or Kottler-Møller coordinates for the proper reference frame of hyperbolic motion, and Born or Langevin coordinates in the case of uniform circular motion.

In the following, Greek indices run over 0,1,2,3, Latin indices over 1,2,3, and bracketed indices are related to tetrad vector fields. The signature of the metric tensor is (-1,1,1,1).

History

Some properties of Kottler-Møller or Rindler coordinates were anticipated by Albert Einstein (1907) when he discussed the uniformly accelerated reference frame. While introducing the concept of Born rigidity, Max Born (1909) recognized that the formulas for the worldline of hyperbolic motion can be reinterpreted as transformations into a "hyperbolically accelerated reference system". Born himself, as well as Arnold Sommerfeld (1910) and Max von Laue (1911) used this frame to compute the properties of charged particles and their fields (see Acceleration (special relativity)#History and Rindler coordinates#History). In addition, Gustav Herglotz (1909) gave a classification of all Born rigid motions, including uniform rotation and the worldlines of constant curvatures. Friedrich Kottler (1912, 1914) introduced the "generalized Lorentz transformation" for proper reference frames or proper coordinates by using comoving Frenet–Serret tetrads, and applied this formalism to Herglotz' worldlines of constant curvatures, particularly to hyperbolic motion and uniform circular motion. Herglotz' formulas were also simplified and extended by Georges Lemaître (1924). The worldlines of constant curvatures were rediscovered by several author, for instance, by Vladimír Petrův (1964), as "timelike helices" by John Lighton Synge (1967) or as "stationary worldlines" by Letaw (1981). The concept of proper reference frame was later reintroduced and further developed in connection with Fermi–Walker transport in the textbooks by Christian Møller (1952) or Synge (1960). An overview of proper time transformations and alternatives was given by Romain (1963), who cited the contributions of Kottler. In particular, Misner & Thorne & Wheeler (1973) combined Fermi–Walker transport with rotation, which influenced many subsequent authors. Bahram Mashhoon (1990, 2003) analyzed the hypothesis of locality and accelerated motion. The relations between the spacetime Frenet–Serret formulas and Fermi–Walker transport was discussed by Iyer & C. V. Vishveshwara (1993), Johns (2005) or Bini et al. (2008) and others. A detailed representation of "special relativity in general frames" was given by Gourgoulhon (2013).

Comoving tetrads

Spacetime Frenet–Serret equations

For the investigation of accelerated motions and curved worldlines, some results of differential geometry can be used. For instance, the Frenet–Serret formulas for curves in Euclidean space have already been extended to arbitrary dimensions in the 19th century, and can be adapted to Minkowski spacetime as well. They describe the transport of an orthonormal basis attached to a curved worldline, so in four dimensions this basis can be called a comoving tetrad or vierbein  (also called vielbein, moving frame, frame field, local frame, repère mobile in arbitrary dimensions):

Fermi–Walker transport and proper transport

While the Frenet–Serret tetrad can be rotating or not, it is useful to introduce another formalism in which non-rotational and rotational parts are separated. This can be done using the following equation for proper transport or generalized Fermi transport of tetrad , namely

where

or together in simplified form:

The first part  represents Fermi–Walker transport, which is physically realized when the three spacelike tetrad fields don't change their orientation with respect to the motion of a system of three gyroscopes. Thus Fermi–Walker transport can be seen as a standard of non-rotation. It turns out that this rotation matrix only affects the three spacelike tetrad fields, thus it can be interpreted as the spatial rotation of the spacelike fields  of a rotating tetrad (such as a Frenet–Serret tetrad) with respect to the non-rotating spacelike fields  of a Fermi–Walker tetrad along the same world line.

Deriving Fermi–Walker tetrads from Frenet–Serret tetrads

For instance, the angular velocity vector between the respective spacelike tetrad fields  and  can be given in terms of torsions  and :

Assuming that the curvatures are constant (which is the case in helical motion in flat spacetime, or in the case of stationary axisymmetric spacetimes), one then proceeds by aligning the spacelike Frenet–Serret vectors in the  plane by constant counter-clockweise rotation, then the resulting intermediary spatial frame  is constantly rotated around the  axis by the angle , which finally gives the spatial Fermi–Walker frame  (note that the timelike field remains the same):

Proper coordinates or Fermi coordinates

In flat spacetime, an accelerated object is at any moment at rest in a momentary inertial frame , and the sequence of such momentary frames which it traverses corresponds to a successive application of Lorentz transformations , where  is an external inertial frame and  the Lorentz transformation matrix. This matrix can be replaced by the proper time dependent tetrads  defined above, and if  is the time track of the particle indicating its position, the transformation reads:

The final transformation has the form

These are sometimes called proper coordinates, and the corresponding frame is the proper reference frame. They are also called Fermi coordinates in the case of Fermi–Walker transport (even though some authors use this term also in the rotational case). The corresponding metric has the form in Minkowski spacetime (without Riemannian terms):

However, these coordinates are not globally valid, but are restricted to

Proper reference frames for timelike helices

In case all three Frenet–Serret curvatures are constant, the corresponding worldlines are identical to those that follow from the Killing motions in flat spacetime. They are of particular interest since the corresponding proper frames and congruences satisfy the condition of Born rigidity, that is, the spacetime distance of two neighbouring worldlines is constant. These motions correspond to "timelike helices" or "stationary worldlines", and can be classified into six principal types: two with zero torsions (uniform translation, hyperbolic motion) and four with non-zero torsions (uniform rotation, catenary, semicubical parabola, general case):

Case  produces uniform translation without acceleration. The corresponding proper reference frame is therefore given by ordinary Lorentz transformations. The other five types are:

Hyperbolic motion

The curvatures  , where  is the constant proper acceleration in the direction of motion, produce hyperbolic motion because the worldline in the Minkowski diagram is a hyperbola:

which are valid within , with the metric

.

which are valid within , with the metric

Uniform circular motion

The curvatures ,  produce uniform circular motion, with the worldline

where

The tetrad can be derived from the Frenet–Serret equations, or more simply be obtained by a Lorentz transformation of the tetrad  of ordinary rotating coordinates:

The corresponding non-rotating Fermi–Walker tetrad  on the same worldline can be obtained by solving the Fermi–Walker part of equation.

The resulting angle of rotation  together with  can now be inserted into, by which the Fermi–Walker tetrad follows

In the following, the Frenet–Serret tetrad is used to formulate the transformation. Inserting into the transformations and using the worldline for  gives the coordinates

which are valid within , with the metric

which are valid within , and the metric

.

The last equations can also be written in rotating cylindrical coordinates (Born coordinates):

which are valid within , and the metric

Frames can be used to describe the geometry of rotating platforms, including the Ehrenfest paradox and the Sagnac effect.

Catenary

The curvatures ,  produce a catenary, i.e., hyperbolic motion combined with a spacelike translation

where

where  is the velocity,  the proper velocity,  as rapidity,  is the Lorentz factor. The corresponding Frenet–Serret tetrad is:

The corresponding non-rotating Fermi–Walker tetrad  on the same worldline can be obtained by solving the Fermi–Walker part of equation.

which together with  can now be inserted into, resulting in the Fermi–Walker tetrad

The proper coordinates or Fermi coordinates follow by inserting  or  into.

Semicubical parabola

The curvatures ,  produce a semicubical parabola or cusped motion

The corresponding non-rotating Fermi–Walker tetrad  on the same worldline can be obtained by solving the Fermi–Walker part of equation.

which together with  can now be inserted into, resulting in the Fermi–Walker tetrad (note that  in this case):

The proper coordinates or Fermi coordinates follow by inserting  or  into.

General case

The worldline is given by

where

The Frenet–Serret tetrad is

The corresponding non-rotating Fermi–Walker tetrad  on the same worldline is as follows: First inserting into gives the angular velocity, which together with  can now be inserted into (left), and finally inserted into (right) produces the Fermi–Walker tetrad. The proper coordinates or Fermi coordinates follow by inserting  or  into (the resulting expressions are not indicated here because of their length).

Overview of historical formulas
In addition to the things described in the previous #History section, the contributions of Herglotz, Kottler, and Møller are described in more detail, since these authors gave extensive classifications of accelerated motion in flat spacetime.

Herglotz
Herglotz (1909) argued that the metric

where

satisfies the condition of Born rigidity when . He pointed out that the motion of a Born rigid body is in general determined by the motion of one of its point (class A), with the exception of those worldlines whose three curvatures are constant, thus representing a helix (class B). For the latter, Herglotz gave the following coordinate transformation corresponding to the trajectories of a family of motions:

(H1) ,

(H2) 

As any six-vector, it has two invariants:

The latter have been studied in the 19th century, and were categorized by Felix Klein into loxodromic, elliptic, hyperbolic, and parabolic motions (see also Möbius group).

Kottler

Kottler pointed out that the tetrad can be seen as a reference frame for such worldlines. Then he gave the transformation for the trajectories

 (with )

Kottler also defined a tetrad whose basis vectors are fixed in normal space and therefore do not share any rotation. This case was further differentiated into two cases: If the tangent (i.e., the timelike) tetrad field is constant, then the spacelike tetrads fields  can be replaced by  who are "rigidly" connected with the tangent, thus

The second case is a vector "fixed" in normal space by setting . Kottler pointed out that this corresponds to class B given by Herglotz (which Kottler calls "Born's body of second kind")

,

and class (A) of Herglotz (which Kottler calls "Born's body of first kind") is given by

which both correspond to formula.

In (1914a), Kottler showed that the transformation

,

describes the non-simultaneous coordinates of the points of a body, while the transformation with 

,

describes the simultaneous coordinates of the points of a body. These formulas become "generalized Lorentz transformations" by inserting

thus

He introduced the terms "proper coordinates" and "proper frame"  for a system whose time axis coincides with the respective tangent of the worldline. He also showed that the Born rigid body of second kind, whose worldlines are defined by

,

is particularly suitable for defining a proper frame. Using this formula, he defined the proper frames for hyperbolic motion (free fall) and for uniform circular motion:

In (1916a) Kottler gave the general metric for acceleration-relative motions based on the three curvatures

In (1916b) he gave it the form:

Møller
Møller (1952) defined the following transport equation

in agreement with Fermi–Walker transport by (without rotation). The Lorentz transformation into a momentary inertial frame was given by him as

in agreement with the Fermi coordinates, and the metric

in agreement with the Fermi metric without rotation. He obtained the Fermi–Walker tetrads and Fermi frames of hyperbolic motion and uniform circular motion (some formulas for hyperbolic motion were already derived by him in 1943):

Worldlines of constant curvatures by Herglotz and Kottler

References

Bibliography

Textbooks
; First edition 1911, second expanded edition 1913, third expanded edition 1919.
 New edition 2013: Editor: Domenico Giulini, Springer, 2013 .

Journal articles

Historical sources

External links
Physics FAQ: Acceleration in Special Relativity
Eric Gourgoulhon (2010): Special relativity from an accelerated observer perspective

Special relativity
Acceleration